Beni Snous or Aït Snous (in berber: ⴰⵢⵜ ⵙⵏⵓⵙ, Ayt Snus and in ) is a town and commune in Tlemcen Province in northwestern Algeria.

Situation 

Beni Snous Commune's territory is situated in the west of the wilaya of Tlemcen.
The city of El Fahs (Beni Hammou), is situated at 41 km in the South-West of Tlemcen.

Relief and hydrography 
The municipality of Beni Snous is situated on the monts de Tlemcen (Mounts of Tlemcen)

Localities of the municipality 
In 1984, the commune of Beni Snous is constituted from the following localities:

 El-Fahs  (chef-lieu) 
 Menzel
 Khémis 
 Ouled Moussa
 Ouled Arbi
 Béni Achir
 Mzoughen Aimani
 Sidi Larbi
 Mazer
 Ouled Bouchama
 Béni Zidaz
 Gasba

References

Communes of Tlemcen Province